Munich Rosenheimer Platz station is one five underground station opened in 1972 on the trunk line of the Munich S-Bahn between Munich Central Station and Munich East station (München Ost station). It is under the street of the same name and Rosenheimerstraße in the Munich district of Haidhausen. It has two platform tracks and is classified by Deutsche Bahn as a category 4 station.

Description
The station was opened with the other underground stations on the trunk line in 1972; construction started in 1966. The escalators, columns and the station stripes are in yellow, as part of the station's colour scheme. Like its northwestern neighbor, Isartor station, the station has no connection to the U-Bahn or long-distance services, but only with trams. In 2007,  station was used daily (Mon-Fri) by 55,600 passengers, entering, exiting and transferring.

The two entrances from the platform each lead to a mezzanine floor. The northwestern exit leads to both sides of Rosenheimerstraße and the southeastern exit leads to Rosenheimerplatz. The mezzanine also includes a direct elevator link to the nearby Hilton hotel.

Around the northwestern exit are the cultural centre of Gasteig with concert halls, the Münchner Volkshochschule (adult education) and the central office of the Munich City Library (Münchner Stadtbibliothek). Because of the proximity to the concert halls, special soundproofing measures were carried out on the tracks during the construction of the cultural centre.

The linking of tram line 25 between Max-Weber-Platz and Grünwald via the S-Bahn trunk line was an important argument for the construction of the eastern tram bypass, which was taken into operation on 8 November 1997.

The platform is 210 metres long and 96 cm high.

Notable places nearby
Gasteig

References

External links

Rosenheimer Platz
Rosenheimer Platz
Railway stations in Germany opened in 1972
1972 establishments in West Germany